Communications and Entertainment Limited (CEL) was an Australian home video cassette distributor in the 1980s. They were originally known as Publishing and Broadcasting Video (unrelated to Publishing and Broadcasting Limited).

History
PBV's labels included: 
Star Video (featuring low-budget films from around the world)
Embassy Home Entertainment
Australian Video (featuring films from the South Australian Film Corporation)
Film World Festival (like Star Video, but better-budget releases)
Playaround Video (released low-budget horror films, erotica, films from Earl Owensby, and a few videos of rock (mostly heavy metal concerts)).
The Storytime Collection (released children's videos of TV and movie versions of famous storybook characters)
Jim Henson Video
MGM/UA Home Entertainment

By the time PBV had become CEL, many of the labels were discontinued, or moved to another company (MGM/UA's releases were through Warner Home Video). CEL's labels included the aforementioned Jim Henson Video, Kidspics, and Thames Video (although this appears to be non-exclusive; some of Thames' video releases were through Pickwick Video). CEL also released RCA-Columbia Pictures Home Video releases prior to the joint venture with Hoyts.

In 1984, Communications and Entertainment Limited entered into an agreement with West Germany's licensor EuroVideo, in order that EuroVideo will distribute CEL's product in the West Germany market. Also that year, Communications and Entertainment Limited launched the film production and distribution agent Starscreen, and signed an agreement with Australian film distributor Greater Union Film Distributors, whereas Greater Union will handle the film distribution theatrically via joint venture project, and CEL would handle home video rights to the Starscreen titles. In 1986, CEL posted an increase in sales and an 81% rise on the company, which already held titles under the CEL Entertainment Revolution banner and decided to fight in their space with the launch of A Chorus Line, a theatrical release that was exhibited on major theatrical screens. That year, on July 30, 1986, Communications and Entertainment Limited decided to return to the rental market, after abandoning it in 1985 in favor of turning to the fullpriced field.

On August 27, 1986, Communications and Entertainment Limited decided to expand on the New Zealand market in order to buy its privately owned production house, and a 30% stake in another Kiwi facility of the studio. On October 29, 1986, Les Smith, who had spent several years at the U.K. as head of Cannon Screen Entertainment (formerly Thorn EMI Screen Entertainment) had returned to Australia, this time at Communications and Entertainment Limited, to serve as head of its home entertainment division, and had to double out its efforts to make A Chorus Line, a rental release offered by CEL Home Video a winner.

In 1987, Communications and Entertainment Limited decided to link its entertainment interests of the Virgin Group to acquire the Rome Theater for $8.3 million, which was in association with Sydney backer Leon Fink as part of a $20 million entertainment complex of which details were disclosed. Also that year, the prospect of a Virgin-CEL merger decided that they chose to list "international buying power for theatrical, homevideo and television product, the Virgin name and international support, and the influx of Virgin titles", and the UK outfit decided to inherit CEL's established distribution structure and marketing muscle, and sent the partner of two entertainment interests in various countries that was originated in different regions, that enhanced the bottom line. The merger attempt was then aborted on May 20, 1987, and CEL is searching for a partner. In late June 1987, it attempted to sell the entire group to Taft-Hardie Group Pty. Ltd, which bid $42 million, but it never realized. That year, in early October 1987, a Melbourne-based company who was financing for the investment and the management groups, Quatro, following a last-minute $48 million bid for the company, won the bid to acquire the Communications and Entertainment Limited group, who supplanted a $42 million offer from the Taft-Hardie Group and saw Quatro played as a major player in the entertainment industry, and partner company Pro-Image Group increasing its production slate for the drama genre.

CEL had also bought Sundowner Film and Video Productions Pty Ltd. The company was publicly listed on the Australian Stock Exchange, but was delisted in 1989 for failing to pay annual fees to the ASX. The company continued for a few years until 1999, when it filed for bankruptcy.

References

Mass media companies of Australia
Home video distributors
Home video companies of Australia
Home video companies established in 1980
Home video companies disestablished in 1999